Stenolophus maculatus is a species of ground beetle in the family Carabidae. It is endemic to North America.

References

Further reading

 

Stenolophus
Articles created by Qbugbot
Beetles described in 1869